"Modern Day Cowboy" is the debut single by American heavy metal band Tesla, from the band's debut studio album, Mechanical Resonance. The song's lyrics make references to criminals such as Billy the Kid and Al Capone, until the final verse, which references Cold War tensions between the United States and the Soviet Union.

Music video
A music video was produced for the song, which shows Nikola Tesla playing films in an abandoned movie theater. Tesla shows footage of the band performing the song, along with scenes from the movies High Noon, Scarface, and Dr. Strangelove. The beginning of the video shows the theater marquee with the names of all three films with some letters missing, along with the name of the band.

Track listing

Charts

In popular culture
The song was featured in the video game Guitar Hero: Warriors of Rock. The song was also featured in the Supernatural episode "Beyond the Mat".

Personnel
 Jeff Keith – lead vocals
 Frank Hannon – lead guitar, acoustic guitar, backing vocals
 Tommy Skeoch – rhythm guitar, acoustic guitar, backing vocals
 Brian Wheat – bass guitar
 Troy Luccketta – drums

References

1986 songs
1987 debut singles
Tesla (band) songs
Geffen Records singles
Songs about cowboys and cowgirls